Over the Top is American heavy metal band the Mentors' fifth album.

Track listing
"Suck for Rent" - 3:51	
"Young Fresh Tight Sweet Stuff" - 3:17
"Over the Top"	- 4:58	
"Sickie Sniffer Test" - 3:01	
"Electric Dick" - 3:55	
"Sex Booze Weed Speed"	- 3:15	
"Whip It Out" - 4:55
"Inches of Three" - 4:48	
"Oxy-Cution Date" (The song lasts 4:05, after there is 3:02 of silence and after a hidden track) - 10:37

Personnel
 Sickie Wifebeater — guitar
 Dr. Heathen Scum — bass
 Moosedick — drums
 Sickie J — guitar
 El Rapo —  vocals
 Sleazy P - Drums (Suck For Rent and Oxycution Date)

References

2005 albums
Mentors (band) albums
Albums produced by Jack Endino